A pudding basin is a bowl or vessel that is specifically used to steam puddings. Typically made of glazed earthenware or tempered glass, this kitchen vessel may also be used as a mixing bowl.

Available in various sizes and designs (the most famous of which being Cornishware striped earthenware design), pudding basins have been manufactured specifically for the steaming of puddings since the growth of British pottery manufacturers in the 17th century.

Pudding basins are often associated with popular historic British dishes such as Christmas pudding, treacle sponge pudding or steak and kidney pudding.

Food preparation utensils